Amour is an assembly constituency in Purnia district in the Indian state of Bihar.

Overview
As per Delimitation of Parliamentary and Assembly constituencies Order, 2008, No 56 Amour Assembly constituency is composed of the following: Amour and Baisa community development blocks.

Amour Assembly constituency is part of No 10 Kishanganj (Lok Sabha constituency).

Members of Legislative Assembly

Election Results

2020

2015 
General Election to the Legislative Assembly of Bihar was held in 5 phases. Amour Assembly constituency had its polling in the last phase on 5 November 2015 and the result was declared on 8 November 2015.

Candidates:

A total of 14 candidates filed their nominations, including one woman candidate. Out of those 14, one candidate withdraw his name from the candidature. 13 candidates contested the election, including the women candidate. Out of 13 candidates, 11 candidates' deposits were forfeited.

Electors and voters:

Total number of 2,80,910 electors (1,49,626 male and 1,31,274 female) were registered. Out of those, only 1,69,281 (60.26%) voters turned out to cast their votes in 275 polling stations.

Result:

Abdul Jalil Mastan of the Indian National Congress Party won the election by a margin of 51,997 votes (31.30% of total valid votes). The total votes cast in his favour was 1,00,135. Runner-up Saba Zafar of Bharatiya Janata Party received 48,138 votes.

1977-2010
In the November 2010 state assembly elections, Saba Zafar of BJP won the Amour assembly seat defeating his nearest rival Abdul Jalil Mastan of Congress. Contests in most years were multi cornered but only winners and runners are being mentioned. Abdul Jalil Mastan of Congress defeated Saba Jafar representing SP in October 2005, contesting as an Independent in February 2005 and representing RJD in 2000. Muzaffar Hussain of SP defeated Abdul Jalil Mastan of Congress in 1995. A. Jalil of Congress defeated Muzaffar Hussain of ICS (SCS). Jalil, Independent, defeated Chandra Sekhar Jha of JP in 1985. M. Moijuddin Munshi of Congress defeated Nazmuddin of Janata Party (Secular – Raj Narain). Chandra Sekhar Jha of JP defeated Md. Moijuddin Munshi of Congress.

References

External links
 

Assembly constituencies of Bihar
Politics of Purnia district